Robert the Bruce (1274–1329) was King of Scots, Earl of Carrick and 7th Lord of Annandale; victor at the Battle of Bannockburn.

Robert Bruce or Robert the Bruce may also refer to:

Nobility, government and politics
Robert de Brus, 1st Lord of Annandale (c. 1070–1142), founder of Gisborough Priory
Robert de Brus, 2nd Lord of Annandale (died c. 1189 or 1194), Lord of Annandale
Robert III de Brus, eldest son of the 2nd lord, predeceased his father
Robert de Brus, 4th Lord of Annandale (c. 1195–1226), married Isabel, second daughter of David of Scotland
Robert de Brus, 5th Lord of Annandale (c. 1210–1295), claimant to the Scottish crown following the death of the Maid of Norway
Robert de Brus, 6th Lord of Annandale (1253–1304), father of the king
Robert Bruce, Lord of Liddesdale (died 1332), illegitimate son of Robert the Bruce
Robert Bruce, 2nd Baron of Clackmannan (died 1403)
Robert Bruce, 3rd Baron of Clackmannan (died 1436)
Robert Bruce, 1st Earl of Ailesbury (1626–1685), English politician
Robert Bruce (Yukon politician) (born 1940), former Speaker of the Yukon Legislative Assembly
Robert Randolph Bruce (1861–1942), Lieutenant-Governor of British Columbia, 1926–1931
Robert Bruce (New Zealand politician) (1843–1917), Scottish born, New Zealand politician and conservationist
Robert Preston Bruce (1851–1893), British Liberal Party politician
Robert Bruce (Lord Broomhall) (d. 1652)

Sports
Robert Bruce (footballer) (1895–?), Scottish footballer
Bobbie Bruce (1906–1978), Scottish international footballer
Robert Bruce (wrestler) (1943–2009), Scottish-born New Zealand professional wrestler and talent agent
Robert Bruce (swimmer) (born 1969), Australian former swimmer

Entertainment
Robert the Bruce (film), a 2019 film about Robert the Bruce King of Scots
Robert Bruce (Scottish composer) (1915–2012), composer and lecturer
Robert Bruce (opera), an 1846 pastiche opera with music taken from works by Gioachino Rossini
Robert Bruce (rapper) (born 1970), American rapper, Psychopathic Records don, and professional wrestler
Robert C. Bruce (1914–2003), American animation voice actor

Other people
Robert Bruce of Kinnaird (1554–1631), Moderator of the General Assembly of the Church of Scotland in 1588 and again in 1592
Robert Bruce (Pitt Chancellor) (1778–1846), professor and pastor, first Chancellor of the University of Pittsburgh, 1819–1935 and 1836–1843
Robert Bruce, Lord Kennet (1718–1785), Scottish advocate, legal scholar and judge
Robert Bruce (1668–1720), Russian general of Scottish background, brother of Jacob Bruce
Robert Bruce (merchant adventurer), Scottish adventurer and son of Chief Justice of Barbados Sir James Bruce
Robert Bruce (trader) (died 1824), Scottish arms trader in Assam
Robert Bruce (active 1870–1900), missionary who revised Henry Martyn's Bible translations into Persian
Robert A. Bruce (1916–2004), American cardiologist
Robert V. Bruce (1923–2008), American historian
Robert Bruce (British Army officer, born 1813) (1813–1862), British Army officer
Robert Bruce (British Army officer, born 1821) (1821–1891), British Army officer, colonel of the Queen's Royal Regiment
Bob Bruce (British Army officer), British Army officer, former commander of 4th Mechanised Brigade, form Military Secretary

Bruce, Robert